Micropterix vulturensis is a species of moth belonging to the family Micropterigidae. It was described by John Heath in 1981. It is widely distributed in the central and southern Apennines.

At lower altitudes, it inhabits open, dry and somewhat rocky beech-mixed forest. Here, adults fly on sunny clearings, between thickets of bramble (Rubus species) and on grassy areas around bushes of juniper (Juniperus species). In the mountains, it has been found up to 2000 meters, where they swarm around blossoming bog pine (Pinus mugo) in full sunshine, often also in small groups. They frequently sit on the male flowers, where they feed on the pollen.

The length of the forewings is 3.5-4.2 mm for males and 4.2–5 mm for females.

References

Micropterigidae
Moths described in 1981
Endemic fauna of Italy
Moths of Europe
Taxa named by John Heath